The Journey to Planet POD is the debut studio album by Perceptual Outer Dimensions, released on August 1, 1994 by Fifth Colvmn Records.

Music
Prior to the release of The Journey to Planet POD, composer Holmes Ives had released "Hinge" and "Lurid Dance of the Erimite" on the 1994 Fifth Colvmn Records compilation Frenzied Computer Resonance.

Reception 
Option described The Journey to Planet POD as "a unique ambient project that mixes elements of "found" sounds into an intricate web that borders on rapture." Sonic Boom praised the album for its "invigorating programming style, unique percussion, and vivid samples" and called it "a trip to another planet, someplace where the listener needs to never stop moving to the music, and the dj never stops mixing up a new track."

Track listing

Personnel 
Adapted from the liner notes of The Journey to Planet POD.

Perceptual Outer Dimensions
 Holmes Ives – instruments, production, recording, mixing

Production and design
 Craig Albertson – cover art
 Tom Baker – mastering
 Zalman Fishman – executive-production

Release history

References

External links 
 
 The Journey to Planet POD at Discogs (list of releases)

1994 debut albums
Perceptual Outer Dimensions albums
Fifth Colvmn Records albums